Favored Nations is a 501(c)(3) charity that functions as a mediator between donors and other nonprofits. The organization is built on a network of individuals who donate monetarily or volunteer in the organization's charity campaigns and operations. The charity was established in 2019 by Josh Heller and Noah Centineo, and is based out of Los Angeles, California. The organization is mostly active in the United States. In the recent years, Favored Nations has taken part in a number of notable campaigns related to human rights movement, voting and COVID-19 pandemic.

Overview
Favored Nations was registered by Noah Centineo and Josh Heller in 2019 and launched in early 2020, with the main office operating from Los Angeles, California.
The organization gained significant media attention and attracted a number of celebrities and influencers to philanthropic cause.

Management model
Favored Nations uses social media networks and e-commerce to raise funds for its charity activity. The nonprofit also designs for sale a variety of merchandise in collaboration with celebrities and influencers and then acts as an intermediary between donors and charities, where each donor can contribute to a charity from the list of nonprofit organizations including Black Lives Matter, HeadCount, Policing Equity, Know Your Rights Camp, Color of Change, The Bail Project and the Florida Rights Restoration Coalition, among many others. As of 2021, the majority of funding is distributed among four main program areas: COVID-19 Emergency Relief Fund, Educational Development, Civil Rights Movements and Charity Partner Support.

It was founded by Noah Centineo (born 1996), an American actor  who currently serves as CEO, and Josh Heller (born 1987), an American entrepreneur and  actor t. He is a co-founder of Favored Nations, where he serves as Chief Marketing Officer. Heller has been instrumental in a number of the nonprofit's campaigns, including COVID-19 Emergency Relief Fund, Voting Campaign and Black Lives Matter Support.

Operations and campaigns
The nonprofit's most notable campaigns and initiatives include COVID-19 Relief Fund, Black Lives Matter Support, in which Centineo and Lana Condor act out scenes from the popular Netflix movie series, March for Democracy in collaboration with the HeadCount, and an Art House gallery in Los Angeles, aimed to getting Generation Z to the 2020 US presidential elections.

References

Philanthropy in the United States
Organizations established in 2019
Volunteer organizations in the United States
Non-profit organizations based in California